Moldy figs are purist advocates of early jazz, originally those such as Rudi Blesh, Alan Lomax, and James Jones, who argued that jazz took a wrong turn in the early 1920s with developments such as the introduction of printed scores. Blesh, for example, dismissed the work of Duke Ellington as "tea dansant music" with no jazz content whatever.

The term was later used by the beboppers with reference to those who preferred older jazz to bebop. During the post-World War II era there was something of a revival of "traditional" jazz, and bebop displaced swing as the "modern" music to which it was contrasted. More recently, Gene Santoro has referred to Wynton Marsalis and others, who embrace bebop but not other forms of jazz that followed it, as "latter-day moldy figs", with bebop now lying on the side of "jazz tradition". 

Although the term was originally a pejorative, it has at times been embraced by trad jazz fans and players.

In Stan Freberg's recorded comedy sketch "Yankee Doodle Go Home", the fife player isn't happy with the drummer. "No, I mean when I accepted the gig I didn't know I was going to play fife with the kind of moldy fig drumming like what is going on up ahead there, man."

Notes

References
 John Lowney, "Langston Hughes and the 'Nonsense' of Bebop", p.357–385 in American Literature, Volume 72, Number 2, June 2000 (Duke University Press).

Jazz culture
Pejorative terms for people
Musical terminology
Jazz terminology